Gigantic may refer to a 2008 film.
 Gigantic, a cancelled Disney movie
 "Gigantic" (song), a song by Pixies
 Gigantic (magazine) an American literary magazine
 Gigantic (video game), a free-to-play video game developed by Motiga
 Gigantic (TV series), a TV series on TeenNick
 Gigantic (A Tale of Two Johns), a 2002 documentary film
 Gigantism, a condition characterized by excessive growth and height significantly above average
 HMHS Britannic, a ship originally named "RMS Gigantic"

See also
 
 
 Giant (disambiguation)